Wojciech Jacek Zajączkowski (born 19 December 1963 in Bydgoszcz) is a Polish diplomat and historian, since January 2018 serving as an ambassador of Poland to China.

Life

Education 
Wojciech Zajączkowski graduated from history at the Catholic University of Lublin in 1987. In 1999 he defended at the Institute of Political Studies of the Polish Academy of Sciences his PhD thesis on ethnic minorities in 19th-century Russia and USSR.

Career 
Till the early 1990s he has been working as an editor. From 1991 to 1998 for the Centre for Eastern Studies as an analyst, Senate of Poland as an advisor, Stefan Batory Foundation as a director of the Central-Eastern Europe Forum. In 1998 he joined the Polish diplomatic service, working at the embassy in Moscow. In 2000 he became chargé d’affaires in Ukraine, responsible for Turkmenistan as well. From 2004 to 2007 he headed the Department for Eastern Policy at the Polish Ministry of Foreign Affairs, and in 2008 he became the Chief Advisor to the Prime Minister of Poland and Head of the Working Group on Energy Security. He served as the Poland ambassador to Romania (2008–2010) and Russia (2010–2014). Later, he was the Director of the Department of Foreign Policy Strategy at the MFA (2014–2018).

In January 2018 he became the Republic of Poland Ambassador to the People's Republic of China. He presented his credentials to the President of the People's Republic of China Xi Jinping on 23 March 2018.

Private life 
Wojciech Zajączkowski is married to Izabella Zajączkowska, with three children. Besides his native Polish, he speaks English, French, Romanian, Russian and Ukrainian languages.

Awards 
In 2009 he received the Romanian National Order of Faithful Service.

Works 

 Federacja czy rozpad Rosji?, Warszawa: Ośrodek Studiów Wschodnich, 1994.
 W poszukiwaniu tożsamości społecznej. Inteligencja baszkirska, buriacka i tatarska wobec kwestii narodowej w Cesarstwie Rosyjskim i ZSRR. Lublin: IESW, 2001. .
 Czy Rosja przetrwa do roku 2000, Warszawa: Oficyna Wydawnicza MOST, 1993.
 Rosja i narody. Ósmy kontynent, Szkic dziejów Eurazji, Warszawa: Wydawnictwo MG, 2009.
 Czech translation by Petruška Šustrová: Rusko a národy: Osmý kontinent, Misgurnus 2011. .
Zrozumieć innych. Metoda analityczna w polityce zagranicznej. Warszawa: Krajowa Szkoła Administracji Publicznej, 2011. .

References 

Ambassadors of Poland to China
Ambassadors of Poland to Romania
Ambassadors of Poland to Russia
Ambassadors of Poland to Turkmenistan
Historians of Russia
John Paul II Catholic University of Lublin alumni
People from Bydgoszcz
20th-century Polish historians
Polish male non-fiction writers
Polish political scientists
Recipients of the National Order of Faithful Service
Living people
1963 births